L. crocea may refer to:

 Larimichthys crocea, a croaker native to the western Pacific
 Leptogaster crocea, a robber fly
 Libnotes crocea, a crane fly